When the Day Breaks is a Canadian animated short co-directed by Wendy Tilby and Amanda Forbis and featuring the voice of Canadian singer-songwriter Martha Wainwright singing the titular song.

Summary
After witnessing an accidental death of a humanoid rooster, Ruby, a humanoid pig, seeks comfort from her everyday life in the city.

Technique
To create the film, directors used pencil and paint on photocopies to achieve a textured look suggestive of a lithograph or a flickering newsreel.

Accolades
Produced by the National Film Board of Canada in 1999, the 9 min. 40 sec. film garnered numerous awards, including the Genie Award for Best Animated Short, the Short Film Palme d'Or at the Cannes Film Festival, TIFF – Best Canadian Short, the Annecy International Animation Film Festival – Animated Short, Grand Prix for short film at Animafest Zagreb and the Banff Television Festival, Best Animation Program. It was also included in the Animation Show of Shows.

It was nominated for an Academy Award for Best Animated Short Film, losing to another animated short produced in Montreal: Aleksandr Petrov's Old Man and the Sea.

References

External links
Watch When the Day Breaks at NFB.ca

Excerpt on Acme Filmworks

1999 films
Canadian animated short films
Short Film Palme d'Or winners
Films shot in Montreal
Films directed by Wendy Tilby
National Film Board of Canada animated short films
Best Animated Short Film Genie and Canadian Screen Award winners
1990s animated short films
1999 animated films
Animated films without speech
1999 short films
1990s Canadian films